Coke Studio is an Indian Television program that features live musical performances by various artists, recorded in the studio that features live musical performances by various artists, recorded in the studio Indian subcontinent, such as Hindustani, Carnatic, Indian folk, as well as contemporary hip hop, rock, and pop music. The program's concept was inspired by the Pakistani version of the show of the same name.

History 
Coke Studio originated in Brazil in 2007 as a unique fusion music project that aimed to blend two contrasting Brazilian artists and their musical styles. Later, Nadeem Zaman, the Marketing Head of  The Coca-Cola Company, partnered with Rohail Hyatt, a former member of Vital Signs, to create a Pakistani version of the show. The Pakistani version premiered in June 2008 with a live audience, but subsequent seasons were recorded in a closed studio format, which remains the show's format to this day.

The Indian version of the Coke Studio, known as Coke Studio @ MTV, debuted in June 2012, with the first season produced by Leslie Lewis and subsequent seasons by multiple producers. The show was a collaboration between Coca-Cola India and MTV India, with MTV India being the official broadcaster for all four seasons.

Following the success of the Pakistani and Indian versions, Coke Studio Bangla was launched in Bangladesh in February 2022.

Coke Studio made a comeback in India in February 2023 after an eight-year break and rebranded itself as Coke Studio Bharat. The show adopted the format of Coke Studio @ MTV and shifted its focus from releasing episodes to releasing individual songs. In the same month, Coke Studio also introduced its first regional edition in India called Coke Studio Tamil, which followed the structure of Coke Studio Bharat.

Format 
The show's format is similar to that of Coke Studio, featuring a unique combination of artists accompanied by a house band and additional musicians. The recorded performances can be viewed on the official YouTube channel and other streaming platforms, showcasing the lead singer(s) while also highlighting the ensemble's contribution through close-ups during live recordings.

The program presents a dynamic blend of both Western and traditional instruments from the Indian subcontinent, such as guitars, pianos, synthesizers, bass guitars, harmonium, rubab, sarod, sitar, bamboo flutes, dholak, tabla, and other percussion instruments.

Versions

Coke Studio @ MTV
The first version of the show, also known as Coke Studio @ MTV, ran for four seasons in partnership with MTV India. The first season of the show debuted on MTV India on June 17, 2011. The second season aired a year later on July 7, 2012, on both MTV India and DD National. The third season premiered on August 17, 2013, on MTV India, Big FM, and DD National, and was later broadcast on All India Radio on August 24, 2013. The fourth season started on March 1, 2015.

Coke Studio Tamil 
In 2023, Coca Cola launched Coke Studio Tamil, releasing a song on 1 February 2023. The format of the show remained unchanged.

Coke Studio Bharat 
Coca Cola announced in a press statement that they would release a new version of the show, called Coke Studio Bharat, in February 2023. This version would include performers from different parts of India.

Coke Studio @ MTV Seasons

Season 1 (2011) 

Each hour-long episode of the show featured six songs from a range of genres including carnatic and Hindustani music, compositions by new musicians, recreated Bollywood tracks, and a special song created on the programme. This season, directed by Supavitra Babul, had a total of 10 episodes, including one which showed the best of Season 1.

Season 2 (2012) 

The second season aired from 7 July 2012 on MTV India and Doordarshan. Every episode featured a composer with his own composed tracks. This season had 8 episodes and two "best of season 2" episodes.

After Season 2, concerts with music from the show, performed by Shilpa Rao, Papon, Advaita, Amit Trivedi, and Hari & Sukhmani, were held at the Rendezvous festival in Delhi, and at Hard Rock Cafe in Hyderabad and Delhi.

Season 3 (2013) 

Season 3 opened on 17 August 2013 on MTV.

Season 4 (2014)

Reception

Coke Studio @ MTV 
Despite including mainstream and folk artists, the inaugural season of Coke Studio @ MTV in 2011 produced by Leslie Lewis was perceived as a letdown. Aditya Swamy, who was then the Executive Vice President and Business Head of MTV India, expressed that requesting a single producer to create 50 songs in 60 days was an excessive expectation. The second season of Coke Studio @ MTV surpassed the expectations of critics. The return of the show was impressive and demonstrated an improvement in both the quality of music produced and the composition of the songs.

See also 
 MTV Unplugged
 Coke Studio Pakistan
 Coke Studio Bangla

References

External links
 Official website

Coke Studio (Indian TV program)
2011 Indian television series debuts
Indian music television series
Indian television series based on non-Indian television series
Indian